Teti Tela (born 7 March 1991) is a Fijian rugby union player who plays for the Fijian Drua in the Super Rugby competition. His position of choice is fly-half.

He made his debut for Fiji against the Barbarians in November 2019.

References

External links
 

Fijian rugby union players
1991 births
Living people
Queensland Country (NRC team) players
Rugby union fly-halves
Brisbane City (rugby union) players
Queensland Reds players
Fijian Drua players
Fiji international rugby union players